In Islamic Law, tazir (ta'zeer or ta'zir) refers to punishment for offenses at the discretion of the judge (Qadi) or ruler of the state. It is one of three major types of punishments or sanctions under Sharia Islamic law — hadd, qisas and ta'zir. The punishments for the Hadd offenses are fixed by the Qur'an or Hadith (i.e. "defined by God"), qisas allow equal retaliation in cases of intentional bodily harm, while ta'zir refers to punishments applied to the other offenses for which no punishment is specified in the Qur'an or the Hadith or is not punishable under either qisas or hudud.

Constant committing of minor sins or the major sins that do not require greater punishment, which are described as wickedness (Fisq) in fiqh terminology, are punished by the judge's discretion, without a certain limit and measure.

In tazir punishments, there is no obligation to prove the crime by witnessing or similar mechanisms.

Overview
The classical Islamic legal tradition did not have a separate category for criminal law as does modern law. The classical Islamic jurisprudence typically divided the subject matter of law into four "quarters", that is rituals, sales, marriage, and injuries. In modern usage, Islamic criminal law has been extracted and collated from that classical Islamic jurisprudence literature into three categories of rules:

Hadd (literally "limit") under Sharia, are rules stated in the Quran and the Hadiths, and whose violation is deemed in Islam as a crime against God, and requires a fixed punishment. Hadd crimes include theft, illicit sexual relations or rape, making unproven accusations of illicit sex, drinking intoxicants like alcohol, apostasy, and highway robbery.
Qisas, (literally "retaliation in kind") and diya) ("blood money"), in Islamic jurisprudence, are the second category of crimes, where Sharia specifies equal retaliation (qisas) or monetary compensation (diya), as a possible punishment. Included in this category is homicide, for example, which Islamic law treats as a civil dispute between believers. Qisas principle is available against the accused, to the victim or victim's heirs, when a Muslim is murdered, suffers bodily injury or suffers property damage. In the case of murder, qisas means the right of a murder victim's nearest relative or wali (legal guardian) to, if the court approves, take the life of the killer or do it in his behalf.
Tazir (literally "to punish", sometimes spelled as taazir, ti'zar, tazar, ta'azar) is the third category, and refers to offense mentioned in the Quran or the Hadiths, but where neither the Quran nor the Hadiths specify a punishment. In Tazir cases, the punishment is at the discretion of the state, the ruler, or a qadi (kadi), or court acting on behalf of the ruler. Tazir punishment is for actions which are considered sinful in Islam, undermine the Muslim community, or a threaten public order during Islamic rule, but those that are not punishable as hadd or qisas crimes.  The legal restrictions on the exercise of that power are not specified in the Quran or the Hadiths, and vary. The judge enjoys considerable leeway in deciding an appropriate form of punishment, and the punishment does not have to be consistent across the accused persons or over time.  The ruler or qadi also has the discretion to forgive tazir offenses.

Scripture
The word tazir is not used in the Quran or the Hadith, in the sense that modern Islamic criminal law uses it. However, in several verses of the Quran, crimes are identified, punishment of the accused indicated, but no specific punishment is described. These instances led early Islamic scholars to interpret the Quran as requiring discretionary punishment of certain offenses, namely Tazir. Example specific verses from the Quran that support taazir are,

Examples of Tazir offenses
Tazir offenses are broadly grouped into two sub-categories in Islamic literature. The first are those offenses that have the same nature but do not exactly meet the complete requirements of hudud crimes. Examples of such Tazir offenses include thefts among relatives, or attempted but unsuccessful robbery, fornication that does not include penetration, and homosexual contacts such as kissing that does not result in fornication. The second sub-category of Tazir offenses relate to offenses committed by an individual that violate the behavior demanded in the Quran and the Hadiths. Examples of the second sub-category include false testimony, loaning money or any property to another person for interest in addition to principal, any acts that threaten or damage the public order or Muslim community or Islam.

The fourteenth century Islamic jurist Ibn Taymiyyah included any form of disobedience as a Tazir offense, although his views were not accepted widely and listed several examples where there is no legal penalty in Sharia:
the man who kisses a boy or a woman unrelated to him by marriage or a very near kinship;
the man who flirts without fornication;
the man who eats a forbidden thing like blood, or dead animal which suffers natural death, or meat that is slaughtered in an unlawful manner;
the man who steals a thing lying in open or one whose value is unclear;
the man who debases the commodities such as foodstuffs and clothes, or who gives short measure of capacity or weight;
the man who bears false witness or encourages others to bear false witness;
the judge who judges contrary to what Allah has enjoined;
the non-Muslim or Muslim engaged in espionage;
the man who questions Qadi's opinion or challenges the views of other Muslims;

Numerous other offenses are included in Tazir category.

Tazir punishments
Tazir punishments were common in Sharia courts. Punishments vary with the nature of crime and include a prison term, flogging, a fine, banishment, and seizure of property. The sixteenth-century Egyptian jurist Ibn Nujaym said that taʿzīr could consist of lashing, slapping, rubbing the ears, a stern telling-off, disparagement short of slander, or an angry look from the judge. Execution is allowed in cases such as practices which split the Muslim community, espionage on behalf of an enemy of the Muslim state. All four schools of fiqh (Madhhab), namely Hanafi, Maliki, Shafii and Hanbali, permit the death penalty at the discretion of the state or Qadi, for certain Tazir offenses if it is proven by at two least witnesses or a self confession. 
Contemporary application

Brunei introduced Tazir into its Syariah Penal Code Order effective 2014. Tazir crimes in Brunei now include offenses such as failing to perform Friday prayers by anyone above 15 years old, any Muslim disrespecting the month of Ramadan, and khalwat (dating or any form of close proximity between unrelated members of opposite sex).

Iran introduced Tazir into its legal code after the 1979 Revolution, naming the section as Qanon-e Tazir. These Tazir laws allow prosecution of offenses such as illicit kissing, failing to wear proper head dress such as hejab, and making critical statements against judges and members of the Council of Guardians.

See also
Hudud
Qisas
Sharia

Further reading
 Wael Hallaq (2009), An introduction to Islamic law. Cambridge University Press. .

References

Arabic words and phrases
Islamic criminal jurisprudence
Punishments in religion
Islamic terminology
Islam and capital punishment